is a Japanese football player. He plays for Kamatamare Sanuki.

Playing career
Yuki Morikawa joined to J2 League club; Kamatamare Sanuki in 2015.

Club statistics
Updated to 22 February 2018.

References

External links
Profile at Kamatamare Sanuki

1993 births
Living people
Ritsumeikan University alumni
Association football people from Kyoto Prefecture
Japanese footballers
J2 League players
J3 League players
Kamatamare Sanuki players
Association football forwards